R (Begum) v Governors of Denbigh High School [2006] is a House of Lords case on the legal regulation of religious symbols and dress under the Human Rights Act 1998.

The case involved Shabina Begum, a Muslim pupil at Denbigh High School in Luton, UK, who sued her school. Begum opposed the schools requirement that she wear the shalwar kameez-style Denbigh school uniform instead of a longer, looser Muslim gown (a jilbāb), on the grounds that the uniform was not compliant with  Sharia law.  Begum lost her case in the High Court, won on appeal to the Court of Appeal, but then lost in March 2006 when the Judicial Committee of the House of Lords unanimously overturned the first appeal.

The case
Shabina Begum (born in the UK, aged 16 at the time and of Bangladeshi origin), was a pupil at Denbigh High School in Luton, Bedfordshire. Four out of the six parent governors were Muslims, the Chair of the Luton Council of Mosques was a community governor and three of the LEA governors were also Muslims. However the school also contained a significant number of pupils of other faiths and the school wished to be inclusive in serving the needs of this diverse community and regarded the school uniform as promoting a sense of communal identity. In addition to uniforms incorporating trousers or skirts, female pupils are also offered a uniform based on the Pakistani or Punjabi shalwar kameez with optional khimar. The school uniform was decided upon in consultation with local mosques, religious organisations and parents. The School considered the shalwar kameez ideal as it was worn by several faith groups and, accordingly, helped to minimise the differences between them.

For two years, Ms. Begum attended the school without complaint, wearing the shalwar kameez, but in September 2002, Ms. Begum, accompanied by her brother and another young male, went to the school and asked that she be allowed to wear the long coat-like garment known as the jilbāb. In the opinion of Begum and her supporters, the particular form of shalwar kameez offered by the school was relatively close-fitting with short sleeves, and was therefore not compliant with the requirements of Islamic dress as they are stated in Sharia law. Shabina refused to attend for three years unless she was allowed to wear the jilbab to school. She said she believed that this was required by her Muslim faith, but also in contravention of the school uniform policy. In addition, the jilbab was, in the opinion of Begum and her supporters, a more culturally-neutral form of Islamic attire.

The school's supporters claimed that after Begum's parents had died, she had come under the undue influence of her brother Shuweb Rahman, a supporter of the pan-Islamist movement Hizb ut-Tahrir. They also argued that if Begum was allowed to attend classes wearing jilbab, other pupils would feel under pressure to adopt stricter forms of Islamic dress.

Begum, with her brother, issued a claim for judicial review of the school's decision not to allow her to wear the jilbab at school.  The claim was made on the grounds that the school had interfered with her right to manifest her religion (Article 9 of the European Convention on Human Rights) and her right to education (Article 2(1) of the first protocol).

Judgment

Appeals
Begum lost the case in the High Court, but later won on appeal to the Court of Appeal. The school appealed against this decision, and the case was heard by the Judicial Committee of the House of Lords. The Department for Education and Skills was allowed to make submissions in the hearing in the House of Lords.  The House of Lords ruled in favour of the school. Begum was represented in the Court of Appeal and the House of Lords by the former Prime Minister's wife Cherie Blair QC.

House of Lords
Lord Bingham of Cornhill stressed at the outset of his judgment that,

The Law Lords took the view that a person's right to hold a particular religious belief was absolute (i.e. could not be interfered with), but that a person's right to manifest a particular religious belief was qualified (i.e. it could be interfered with if there was a justification).

Three of the five Law Lords held that Begum's rights had not been interfered with (Lord Bingham, Lord Scott of Foscote and Lord Hoffmann), and two held that they had (Lord Nicholls of Birkenhead and Baroness Hale of Richmond).

All five agreed, however, that in this particular case there were justifiable grounds for interference, one of the grounds being to protect the rights of other female students at the school who would not wish to be pressured into adopting a more extreme form of dress.

See also

 Islam in the United Kingdom
 Islamic dress in Europe
 French law on secularity and conspicuous religious symbols in schools

References

External links
 Video of Shabina Begum Just before verdict
 Judgment of the House of Lords
 The Appeal Court judgment (March 2, 2005)
 The High Court judgment (June 15, 2004)
 BBC
 School wins Muslim dress appeal (March 22, 2006)
 Schoolgirl loses Muslim gown case (June 15, 2004)
 Schoolgirl wins Muslim gown case (March 2, 2005)

United Kingdom civil rights case law
Religion in England
Islamic clothing controversy in Europe
House of Lords cases
Islam and children
Religion and education
Education case law
2006 in education
2006 in religion
Education in England
2006 in British case law
Law about religion in the United Kingdom